Morgane Rihet (born 14 April 1994) is a French ice hockey player for SOC Hockey and the French national team.

She represented France at the 2019 IIHF Women's World Championship.

References

External links

1994 births
Living people
French women's ice hockey forwards
Ice hockey people from Paris
Ice hockey players at the 2012 Winter Youth Olympics